Ectogoniella is a genus of moths of the family Erebidae. The genus was described by Strand in 1920.

Species
Ectogoniella insularis Sugi, 1982 Japan
Ectogoniella pangraptalis Strand, 1920 Taiwan

References

Hypeninae